Jean-Henri Levasseur, called "the younger" (29 May 1764 in Beaumont-sur-Oise – 1823 in Paris) was a French cellist, composer and music educator.

Biography 
Levasseur's father was a singing teacher at the Royal Opera of Paris, and from 1755 to 1757 an inspecteur général for a brief period. Jean-Henri Levasseur received cello lessons from François Cupis de Renoussard, who also worked at the opera, and then from Jean-Louis Duport. In 1789 he joined the Paris Opera Orchestra, where he then occupied the place of first cello until 1823. He was appointed professor of the Conservatoire de Paris at the time of its formation and taught there for thirty-eight years. His main students were Jacques-Michel Hurel de Lamare, Charles Baudiot and Louis Norblin. Levasseur was also attached to the music of the Emperor Napoleon and then to King Louis XVIII's chapel.

Levasseur was one of the main collaborators of the cello method conceived by Pierre Baillot and adopted for teaching at the Conservatoire de Paris.

Selected compositions 
 Sonates pour violoncelle, Op. I ; Paris, Naderman ;
 Duos pour deux violoncelles, liv. 1 et 2 ; Paris, Louis ;
 Exercices pour le violoncelle, Op. 10, Paris, Langlois.

Sources 
 François-Joseph Fétis, Arthur Pougin, Biographie universelle des musiciens et bibliographie générale de la musique, Paris, Firmin-Didot, vol.5, 1881, (p. 290).

References

External links 
 Levasseur, Jean-Henri (1764 - 1823), cellist, teacher on Oxford Index
 Levasseur, Jean-Henri le jeune on Dictionnaire des compositeurs francs-maçons
 Jean-Henri Levasseur on The Cambridge Companion to the Cello
 Levasseur, Jean-Henri on Encyclopedia.com

18th-century French composers
18th-century male musicians
French classical cellists
French music educators
1764 births
1823 deaths